Wari Kunka (Aymara wari vicuña, kunka throat, "vicuña throat", wari kunka a medical plant (Thamnolia vermicularis), Hispanicized spelling Huaricunca) is a mountain in the Andes of Peru, about  high. It is situated in the Puno Region, El Collao Province, Santa Rosa District. It lies northeast of the lake Lurisquta, northwest of the mountain Janq'u Q'awa.

References

Mountains of Puno Region
Mountains of Peru